Vagana is a surname. Notable people with the surname include:

Joe Vagana (born 1975), New Zealand rugby league player
Linda Vagana (born 1971), New Zealand netball player and coach
Nigel Vagana (born 1975), New Zealand rugby league player